Actinomycetospora is a genus in the phylum Actinomycetota (Bacteria).

Etymology
The name Actinomycetospora derives from:New Latin noun actinomyces -etis (from Greek noun , a beam and Greek noun  -, mushroom or other fungus), an actinomycete; Greek feminine gender noun spora (σπορά), a seed and, in biology, a spore; New Latin feminine gender noun Actinomycetospora, referring to an actinomycete with spore chains.

Species
The genus contains the following species:
 A. atypica Zhang et al. 2014
 A. callitridis Kaewkla and Franco 2019
 A. chiangmaiensis Jiang et al. 2008
 A. chibensis Tamura et al. 2011
 A. chlora Tamura et al. 2011
 A. cinnamomea Tamura et al. 2011
 A. corticicola Tamura et al. 2011
 A. endophytica Sakdapetsiri et al. 2018
 A. iriomotensis Yamamura et al. 2011
 A. lutea Tamura et al. 2011
 A. rhizophila He et al. 2015
 A. rishiriensis Yamamura et al. 2011
 A. soli Chantavorakit and Duangmal 2022
 A. straminea Tamura et al. 2011
 A. succinea Tamura et al. 2011

See also
 Bacterial taxonomy
 Microbiology

References

Bacteria genera
Actinomycetota
Monotypic bacteria genera